The Schauspiel Frankfurt is the municipal theatre company for plays in Frankfurt, Hesse, Germany. It is part of Städtische Bühnen Frankfurt.

History
In the late 1770s the theatre principal Abel Seyler was based in Frankfurt, and established the city's theatrical life.

Opened in 1782, the Comoedienhaus (comedy house) was the first permanent venue of the Frankfurt theatre, both plays and opera (drama and opera). Its traditional house, the Schauspielhaus, built in 1902 by architect Heinrich Seeling at the Theaterplatz (now Willy-Brandt-Platz) was destroyed in World War II. In 1926, Brecht's A Respectable Wedding premiered.

Main temporary location of the Schauspiel from 1945 to 1963 was the Börsensaal. A new house for opera and play was built at the Theaterplatz, completed in 1963. When Harry Buckwitz was general manager, the ruins of the Schauspielhaus were restructured to house both play and opera. Buckwitz focused on plays by Bertolt Brecht, including the world premiere of Die Gesichte der Simone Machard in 1957.

On 31 October 1985, the planned first performance of Fassbinder's Garbage, the City and Death caused a theater scandal. Spectators occupied the stage and prevented the actors from continuing to play.

Venues 
 Schauspielhaus (689 seats), Willy-Brandt-Platz
 Kammerspiele (185 seats), Neue Mainzer Straße
 Bockenheimer Depot (400 seats), Carlo-Schmid-Platz
 Box (70 seats), Willy-Brandt-Platz

Städtische Bühnen 
Schauspiel Frankfurt is part of the municipal Städtische Bühnen Frankfurt.

Intendant 

 1879–1912 
 1912–1916 
 1916–1920 
 1920–1929 Richard Weichert
 1929–1933 Alwin Kronbacher
 1933–1944 
 1945–1947 Toni Impekoven
 1947–1951  / Heinz Hilpert
 1951–1968 Harry Buckwitz
 1968–1972 Ulrich Erfurth
 1972–1980 Peter Palitzsch
 1980–1981  / Johannes Schaaf
 1981–1985 
 1985–1990 Günther Rühle
 1990–1991 
 1991–2001 
 2001–2009 
 2009–2017 
 Since 2017

See also
 Oper Frankfurt

References

External links
  (Bühnen Frankfurt)
  (Schauspiel Frankfurt)

Theatre companies in Germany
Theatres in Germany
Buildings and structures in Frankfurt
Culture in Frankfurt
Tourist attractions in Frankfurt
Frankfurt-Altstadt